Kovačec is a Croatian surname. The surname may refer to:

 August Kovačec (born 1938), Croatian linguist and academician
 Krešo Kovačec (born 1969), German footballer of Croatian origin

Croatian surnames